Manosque (Provençal Occitan: Manòsca in classical norm or Manosco in Mistralian norm) is the largest town and commune in the Alpes-de-Haute-Provence department in southeastern France. However, it is not the préfecture (capital) of the department, which is the smaller town of Digne-les-Bains. Manosque is located at the far eastern end of the Luberon near the Durance river.

History
Manosque has existed since before 966 when it is first mentioned historically. Commerce thrived in the town in the 13th century leading the population to increase to 10,000 inhabitants. It was at this time that the city walls were constructed. They have been completely destroyed apart from a few remaining gates. The population suffered greatly starting in the 18th century due to plagues in 1720 and 1834. Between 1950 and 1970, the town had a huge increase in population along with other areas south of the Luberon. A threefold increase in inhabitants occurred.

Population

Personalities
 Economy
 Olivier Baussan, founder of L’Occitane and Oliviers & Co.
 Science
 Félix Esclangon (1905-1956), physicist, born and buried in Manosque.
 Medicine
 Fava of Manosque was a Jewish physician and surgeon in the early 14th century (c. 1321).
 Pierre Gérard Vassal (1769-1840) doctor and surgeon born in Manosque.
 Writers
 Marc-Antoine Laugier (1711-1769) born in Manosque, Jesuit writer and music critic considered the father of naturalism.
 Élémir Bourges (1852-1925) born in Manosque, novelist and journalist.
 Jean Giono (1895-1970) born and died in Manosque, buried in the communal cemetery.
 Pierre Magnan (1922-2012) born in Manosque, passionate writer of Provence.
 René Frégni born in Marseille, lived in Manosque.
 Sonia Chiambretto writer, lived in Manosque, worked with others on the archives of the Papon case.
 Politicians
 François Joseph de Pochet (1729-1794), born in Manosque, deputy to the Estates General of 1789, representing the sénéchaussée of Aix-en-Provence.
 Henri Maurel (1867-1935), born in Manosque, deputy for Bouches-du-Rhône in 1919.
 Pierre Augier (1910-1963), deputy for Vaucluse, and mayor of Pertuis, born in Manosque.
 Actors
 Christian Barbier (1924-2009) spent the last years of his life in Manosque and died there.
 Hafsia Herzi born in Manosque in 1987.
 Grégory Basso born in Manosque in 1974, French actor and singer, participant in TV reality shows.
 Artists
 The English painter Ralph Rumney spent the last years of his life in Manosque.
 Musicians
 The composer Adolphe Blanc was born in Manosque on the 24 June 1828.
 The jazz musician Olivier Gatto born in Manosque en 1963.
 The French rock guitarist, singer, and movie soundtrack artist - Stéphane Honde (aka Steph Honde) : "Rock You Like a Hurricane" in collaboration with Micki Milosevic under the band name "Unprotected Innocence",Sony Music Entertainment in the movie HellBoy, released by Lionsgate, April 2019.
 The French rock group Café Bertrand.
 The bass-baritone Vincent le Texier.
 Sports
 The athlete Salvatore Alario, junior French high jump champion in the 1970s.
 The motocross driver Jean-Michel Bayle born in Manosque in 1969.
 The swimmer Esther Baron was a member of the EP Manosque club.
 The amateur French cycling champion 1971 Richard Podesta.
 The international athlete Gloria Garrido was born in Manosque in 1951
 The professional racing cyclist Julien El Farès, born in Manosque in 1985.
 The racing cyclist Édouard Fachleitner (1921-2008), nicknamed "le berger de Manosque" (the shepherd of Manosque), second in the Tour de France 1947.
 The middle-distance runner (800 metres) Florent Lacasse.
 The flyweight boxer Karim Guerfi, junior world champion, champion of France, champion of Europe (2013).

Twin towns
Manosque is twinned with:
 Leinfelden-Echterdingen, Germany
 Voghera, Italy

See also
 Coteaux de Pierrevert AOC
Communes of the Alpes-de-Haute-Provence department

References

External links

Official website 
activities in Manosque and surroundings 

Communes of Alpes-de-Haute-Provence
Alpes-de-Haute-Provence communes articles needing translation from French Wikipedia